Johnny Martín Vegas Fernández (born 9 February 1976) is a Peruvian former professional footballer. He is currently the 3rd-highest-goalscoring goalkeeper of all time with 45 goals in all competitions – 30 from penalties and 9 from outfield goals.

References

External links

1976 births
Living people
People from Huancayo
Peruvian footballers
Peru international footballers
Sport Boys footballers
Unión Huaral footballers
Club Deportivo Universidad de San Martín de Porres players
FBC Melgar footballers
Sporting Cristal footballers
Sport Áncash footballers
Cienciano footballers
Alianza Atlético footballers
Unión Comercio footballers
Association football goalkeepers